Andrew Baird (11 June 1866 – 1916) was a Scottish amateur footballer who played for Queen's Park as a goalkeeper. He was capped by Scotland at international level.

Honours 
Queen's Park

 Scottish Cup: 1892–93

References

External links

London Hearts profile

1866 births
1916 deaths
Date of death missing
Scottish footballers
Scotland international footballers
Queen's Park F.C. players
Association football goalkeepers
Place of death missing
Footballers from Irvine, North Ayrshire